The 2002 African Judo Championships was organised by the African Judo Union in Cairo, Egypt from 4 October 2002 to 7 October 2002.

References

External links
 

African Judo Championships
African Championships
International sports competitions hosted by Egypt
Judo competitions in Egypt
October 2002 sports events in Africa